Jole Santelli (28 December 1968 – 15 October 2020) was an Italian politician. A member of Forza Italia, she was the President of Calabria from 15 February 2020 until her death eight months later.

Biography 
After graduating in Law at the Sapienza University of Rome, Santelli became a lawyer. She later joined Silvio Berlusconi's centre-right party, Forza Italia, and was elected to the Chamber of Deputies for the first time at the 2001 Italian general election.

From 2001 to 2006 Santelli was undersecretary at the Ministry of Justice in the Berlusconi II and the Berlusconi III cabinets. She was elected to the Chamber of Deputies again in the 2006, the 2008 and the 2013 general elections. From May to December 2013 Santelli was undersecretary at the Ministry of Labour in the Letta Cabinet, until Forza Italia withdrew its support from the government.

Since 2013 Santelli has been the regional coordinator of Forza Italia in Calabria and has been deputy mayor of Cosenza from 2016 to 2019. In the 2018 general elections Santelli was elected one more time to the Chamber of Deputies.
In December 2019 she became the centre-right candidate for President of Calabria at the 2020 Calabrian regional election, which she won with around 55% of votes.

Death 
On 15 October 2020, Santelli was found dead at her home, aged 51, after suffering a heart attack and internal bleeding. She had also suffered from cancer.

References

External links 

Files about her parliamentary activities (in Italian): XIV , XV, XVI, XVII, XVIII legislature.

1968 births
2020 deaths
20th-century Italian lawyers
20th-century Italian women politicians
20th-century women lawyers
21st-century Italian lawyers
21st-century Italian women politicians
21st-century women lawyers
Deputies of Legislature XIV of Italy
Deputies of Legislature XV of Italy
Deputies of Legislature XVI of Italy
Deputies of Legislature XVII of Italy
Deputies of Legislature XVIII of Italy
Forza Italia (2013) politicians
Forza Italia politicians
Italian Socialist Party politicians
Italian women lawyers
People from Cosenza
Presidents of Calabria
Sapienza University of Rome alumni
The People of Freedom politicians
Deaths from bleeding
Women members of the Chamber of Deputies (Italy)